Who Is Princess?: Girls Group Debut Survival Program is a Japanese reality competition show. The series was a joint project between FNC Entertainment Japan and Nippon TV with the intention of creating a Japanese girl group aimed at a global audience. The show was presented by Takanori Nishikawa. The winners of the show debuted as the group Prikil in May 2022.

Who Is Princess? premiered on October 5, 2021, and is available for streaming on Hulu Japan, GyaO!, Weverse, SoftBank VR Square, and iQIYI. An abridged version was serialized on Nippon TV's variety show  with live commentary from the show's panelists beginning on October 3, 2021.

Background
Who Is Princess?: Girls Group Debut Survival Program was announced on September 19, 2021. The series was created in cooperation with FNC Entertainment and Nippon TV to create a 5-member Japanese girl group with a "girl crush" concept aimed at a global audience out of 15 contestants. The theme song, "Fun", is composed by Galacktica, and its music video was released on the same day of the announcement, with the dance choreographed by Kiel Tutin. The show was scheduled to broadcast on Hulu Japan, GyaO!, Weverse, SoftBank VR Square, and iQiyi beginning October 5, 2021. An abridged version was serialized on Nippon TV's variety show  with live commentary from the show's panelists beginning on October 3, 2021.

The show is hosted by Takanori Nishikawa. The mentors, known as " coaches", consist of Bae Eun-kyoung (dance),  (vocal), and Mayuko Kawakita (modeling).

Contestants
The contestants in Who Is Princess? consist of 15 girls, with a combined average age of 15.6 years.

Episodes

Rankings
The contestants are arranged into two groups: Princess and Challenger. Being a Princess increases chances of debut, while being a Challenger increases risk of elimination.

Summary

Color key

Boys Group Dance Battle
Mission 1 is the Boys Group Dance Battle. In episodes 1 through 3, the contestants were split into two groups, Princess and Challenger, by Bae Eun-kyung, after evaluations for the "Fun" music video. Each group was assigned choreographies from boy band songs. The contestants are then reassigned groups based on the mentors' evaluations, and one Challenger is eliminated from the show.

Solo Performance Battle
Mission 2 is the Solo Performance Battle. In episodes 4 through 7, each Princess and Challenger must duel in a two-round performance battle consisting of a vocal performance and a dance performance.  is introduced as the vocal coach, while Bae Eun-kyoung oversaw the dance performance. The contestants are then reassigned groups based on the mentors, with one Challenger eliminated from the show.

Popteen Photo Shooting Battle
Mission 3 is the Popteen Photo Shooting Battle, led by Mayuko Kawakita as the contestants' mentor. The contestants are assigned to pick and coordinate an outfit from 551 items on a theme, with the photo shoot published in the January 2022 issue of the magazine Popteen. When finished, the contestants are then evaluated by Nishikawa, Kawakita, and Popteen models  and  through a runway show and a photo shoot. Nishikawa announced there will be no eliminations for this mission.

J-pop × K-pop Performance Battle
Mission 4 is the J-pop × K-pop Performance Battle, where Princesses and Challengers are shuffled into three teams. Each team is performing a J-pop song with original K-pop dance choreography. One person from the losing team is eliminated.

Girls Group Performance Battle
Mission 5 is the Semi Final Mission, later renamed the Girls Group Performance Battle, where the Princess and Challenger teams are performing a song from a K-pop girl group. Two Challengers are eliminated from the show.

Original Song Performance Battle

In episodes 13 through 15, the finals were split into two rounds. The teams performed the theme song "Fun" for the first round and "Somebody", an original song by Galacktica, for the second round. Both rounds were judged by Galacktica.

Notes

References

External links
  

Hulu Japan
Japanese music television series
Reality competition television series
2021 Japanese television series debuts
2022 Japanese television series endings